Riaz is a male given name and surname from Arabic.

Given name
Riaz (actor) (born 1972), Bangladeshi film actor
Riaz Afridi (born 1985), Pakistani cricketer
Riaz Ahsan (1951–2008), Pakistani statistician
Riaz Amin (born 1998), English professional martial artist
Riaz Bagwan (born 1960), Indian cricketer
Riaz Basra (1967–2002), Pakistani militant
Riaz Farcy (born 1967), Hong Kong cricketer
Riaz Hassan, Australian academic
Riaz Poonawala (born 1961), former cricketer
Riaz Shahid (died 1972), Pakistani filmmaker and journalist
Riaz Ahmed Sohee (born 1960), Pakistani bureaucrat

Surname
Fahmida Riaz (born 1946), Urdu writer
Mohammed Riaz (born 1972), Indian field hockey player
Wahab Riaz (born 1985), Pakistani cricketer

In fiction
Riaz, a university student played by Sheplo Mozomil in the British web series Corner Shop Show.

See also
Riaz, municipality in the district of Gruyère in the canton of Fribourg in Switzerland.
Riaz Gujjar, a 1991 Pakistani film

Arabic-language surnames
Arabic masculine given names